Kris Duggan (born July 10, 1974) is an Australian-born entrepreneur, advisor, investor, who co-founded and was the founding CEO of Badgeville and BetterWorks.

Life and education 

Kris Duggan was born in Sydney, and grew up in Houston, Texas and then Southern California. He graduated with an MBA in Information Technology from University of California, Irvine. He moved to Silicon Valley in 1999 and resides in Palo Alto with his wife and two sons.

Career 

From 2003 until 2006, Duggan held senior sales management positions with WebEx prior to its acquisition by Cisco for $3.2 billion. The company is currently known as Cisco WebEx, and provides a host of virtual, on-demand collaboration software including web conferencing and videoconferencing.

From 2009 until 2013, Duggan served as an advisor to Palantir Technologies, assisting with go-to-market strategy and execution. He developed the company in a number of ways, including expansion into the federal government.

Kris Duggan co-founded Badgeville in 2010. During his three-year tenure as CEO, the company raised $40M in capital, including $25M in a third round of funding from InterWest Partners. 

In 2013, Duggan co-founded BetterWorks, a Silicon Valley-based company that provides a cloud-based continuous performance management platform for enterprise companies. BetterWorks is funded by Kleiner Perkins (board member John Doerr) and Emergence Capital (board member Jason Green) and has raised $40M in capital. In 2015, Duggan created the BetterWorks performance tracker smartphone app for the Apple watch. During Duggan’s tenure, BetterWorks raised $15.5M from a group of investors in 2014 and another $20M in Series B funding in 2016. Duggan and the company made national news in 2015 for switching from typical annual reviews and pay raises to other incentives. Duggan resigned as CEO of BetterWorks in July 2017 following allegations of sexual misconduct and battery by an ex-employee. As of February 2018, Duggan was an active board member.

Kris Duggan is an advisory chair to the Alchemist Accelerator, an organization which facilitates enterprise startups and advises new entrepreneurs. He was also an adjunct faculty member for Singularity University.

Legal issues 
On July 11, 2017, Beatrice Kim, a former employee of BetterWorks, filed a civil lawsuit in Superior Court in San Francisco against the company, Duggan, and two other employees accusing them of sexual harassment and discrimination. Kim's accusations against Duggan in particular included battery and assault. Duggan denied the allegations. He resigned his position as CEO of BetterWorks on July 26, 2017. The lawsuit was settled for around $1 million. The claims of sexual misconduct and the controversy surrounding them led to the delayed publication of a book co-written by Duggan; it was later published without his name.

References

External links

1974 births
Living people
Australian businesspeople
Gamification
University of California, Irvine alumni